Sickles is an unincorporated community in Caddo County, Oklahoma, United States.

Children from Sickles attend schools that are part of the Lookeba-Sickles School District founded in 1960.

References

Unincorporated communities in Caddo County, Oklahoma
Unincorporated communities in Oklahoma